Anna Salai, formerly known as St. Thomas Mount Road or simply Mount Road, is an arterial road in Chennai, India. It starts at the Cooum Creek, south of Fort St George, leading in a south-westerly direction towards St. Thomas Mount, and ends at the Kathipara Junction in Guindy. Beyond the Kathipara Junction, a branch road arises traversing westwards to Poonamallee to form the Mount-Poonamallee Road while the main branch continuing southwards to Chennai Airport, Tambaram and beyond to form Grand Southern Trunk Road (GST Road or NH45). Anna Salai, which is more than 400 years old, is acknowledged as the most important road in Chennai city. The head offices of many commercial enterprises and public buildings are located along Anna Salai. It is the second longest road in Chennai, after EVR Periyar Salai.

There were several flyover projects under proposal along the stretch, many of which have been shelved owing to the construction of the Chennai Metro Rail project, which runs along the median of the road. Anna Salai Head Post office, one of the most important post offices in the city, is located on this road. It was established in 1854 as Mount Road SO as a non-gazetted delivery office. With the growth of commerce and urbanization, this SO was upgraded to gazetted in the year 1955. Nomenclature of this Head Post office was changed from Mount Road Head Post office to Anna Road Head Post office on 15 September 1974.

History

Anna Salai can be traced from at least the early 17th century, and has its origins in a cart track which was used by the European employees of the British East India Company to travel from the factory at Fort St George to the holy town of St Thomas Mount where the apostle St Thomas was crucified. The road, in its present form, took shape during the time of Charles Macartney who served as Governor of Madras. With the construction of Marmalong Bridge in 1724, the road started gaining prominence. In the following years, the road became part of the city's central business district which originally covered only George Town. Today, most of Chennai's business and corporate offices are located on Anna Salai.

In the 1700s, the road was lined with garden houses and large colonial mansions with balconies and verandas set amidst lush gardens. By the 1800s, Mount Road has become the traders' area of the city of Madras while First Line Beach in Georgetown remained the seat of processing, shipping and manufacturing businesses. However, the business activities of Mount Road was responsible for the city's economic growth. Several giant firms had beginnings on Mount Road, from the Amalgamations group to the TVS group. The road's proximity to the Government House, the home of the Governor, and the palaces of the Nawabs of Arcot resulted in several firms selling cars and other luxury goods setting up shops on the road. Simpson & Co, which moved to its current location opposite Government Estate after 1875, began building carriages and coaches and then cars. In the early 1900s, the road became the entertainment hub for the British. In 1903, the first steam-driven car was taken for its debut drive on Mount Road. To overcome the Great Depression of the 1930s, Simpon's introduced the hire purchase system for cars and trucks. In the 1930s, the TVS group, which was a travel operator in mofussil areas, was established in Madras by acquiring the Madras Auto Service property. In the 1940s, Anantharamakrishnan helped with the formation of Amalgamations & Co. The city's first skyscraper, the LIC Building, was built on Anna Salai in 1959. Several major firms were then established, namely, Spencers & Co, Victoria Family Hotel (the present location of the Indian Overseas Bank Headquarters) and Higginbothams.

The Stretch
Anna Salai starts from the Parktown area of Chennai city where Chennai Central railway terminus is situated. It, then, traverses the Island with its statue of Sir Thomas Munro to the other side of the Coovum before entering the neighbourhoods of Thousand Lights and Teynampet areas. From Teynampet, it continues straight southwards to Nandanam and Saidapet before traversing the Maraimalai Adigal Bridge across the Adyar River to Little Mount and finally, Guindy. Anna Salai is maintained by the Tamil Nadu Highways Department. The road extends for a total of 11 kilometres and traverses the heart of the city.

By the 2010s, the stretch between Parry's Corner and Nandanam was used by over 16,000 vehicles during rush hour. Anna Salai is used by over 0.183 million vehicles every day. The Metropolitan Transport Corporation in Anna Salai carries about 14,000 passengers per hour per direction.

Safety level
Anna Salai remains the road in the city experiencing second most number of accidents annually, next only to Jawaharlal Nehru Road (100 ft Inner Ring Road), with one person being injured every 1.13 days. Together, these roads account for almost 14 per cent of the 5,101 accidents that occurred in Chennai in 2010.

Landmarks on Anna Salai

Major landmarks

 Agurchand Mansion (built late 1800s)
 Anna Flyover
 Ashok Leyland - ALCOB Building
 Bharat Overseas Bank Headquarters
 Indian Overseas Bank Headquarters
 Bharat Insurance Building (built 1897)
 Century Plaza
 Christ Church (built 1852)
 Cosmopolitan Club
 Cosmopolitan Club Golf Links
 Pasumpon Thevar Statue 
 American Consulate
 Devaneya Paavaanar Library
 Devi Theater
 Dravida Munnetra Kazhagam [DMK] (Party Headquarters)
 Gove House (built 1916)
 The Grand Chola Hotel
 Guindy Railway Overbridge
 Higginbotham's (India's oldest bookshop) (built 1844)
 Hindustan Teleprinters Limited (built early 1900s)
 Hyatt Regency Hotel
 Indian Oil Building
 Intellectual Property India Headquarters
 Island Grounds Exhibition Centre
 Kalignar Satellite Television Headquarters
 Kamaraj Memorial Hall
 Kathipara Cloverleaf Intersection
 Le Royal Meridien Hotel
 LIC Building (Chennai's first skyscraper)
 Madras Gymkhana Club
 Maraimalai Adigal Bridge
 Mount Road Mosque
 Thousand Lights Mosque (built early 1800s)
 Mount Road Head Post Office
 The Hindu
 The Mail (built 1921)
 Thevar Statue
 Oxford University Press
 P Orr & Sons (built 1873)
 Panagal Building
 The Park Hotel
 Poombuhar Building (built late 1800s)
 Rajaji Hall (built 1802)
 Raheja Towers
 Rani Seethai Hall
 Rayala Towers
 Sacred Heart School, Church Park
 Safire Theatre complex (now demolished)
 Saidapet Teachers' College
 Semmozhi Poonga
 Simpsons
 Spencer Plaza
 SPIC Building
 State Bank of India building (built early 1900s)
 St. George's Cathedral (built 1816)
 St. Thomas Mount
 Sterling Towers
 Taj Connemara Hotel
 Tamil Nadu Electricity Board Headquarters
 Tamil Nadu Legislative Assembly Government Estate
 Tamil Nadu Newsprint and Papers Limited (TNPL)
 Tamil Nadu Pollution Control Board
 Tarapore Towers
 The British Council
 VGP Victory House
 Victoria Technical Institute
 Voltas
 Willington Bridge
 YMCA

Railway Stations
 Chintadripet MRTS railway station
 Guindy railway station

See also

 Transport in Chennai

References

Roads in Chennai
Central business districts in India
Memorials to C. N. Annadurai